D'Academy or DA is the first and biggest dangdut music talent show in Indonesia. Production is conducted by Indosiar Production Team (November 2015 - March 2016) and Indonesia Entertainmen Produksi (April 2016 - December 2017). This event has successfully risen up dangdut music phenomenon, and this program has become one of most successful talent competition shows in Indonesia. The shows success has resulted in the creation of two spin-off series, those being D 'Academy Celebrity, which features celebrities, and D' Academy Asia, which features contestants from around Southeast Asia.

The show is open for any Indonesian citizens between the ages of 15 and 28 who are not already signed to a record label. All participants who successfully pass the audition process receive training in the form of choreography, vocal performance, personality and fashion advice from some experts in their respective fields, such as Hamdan ATT, Nassar, Uncle Jo, Adibal Sahrul, Dedi Puja, and Mislam. Participants are gradually eliminated every week until grand final night. The performance of the participants is judged by the judges such as Iis Dahlia, Inul Daratista, Rita Sugiarto, Elvy Sukaesih, Saipul Jamil, Hetty Koes Endang, Beniqno, and Dewi Perssik, as well as by the viewers and fans via SMS voting. In each episode, participants with the lowest SMS vote amount will be tersenggol, or eliminated.
The overall winner of the competitions gets a cash prize of 150 million rupiah (roughly $10,000 USD) and a car. For the third season, the cash prize was upped to 250 million rupiahs (roughly $15,000 USD). In addition, the winner is also entitled to a management contract with Stream Entertainment as well as a recording opportunity to launch a single or an album through 3D Entertainment, a dangdut label.

The hosts are Ramzi, Irfan Hakim, Rina Nose, Andhika Pratama, and Gilang Dirga. The program premiered on Monday, February 3, 2014, for its first season, its second season on February 8, 2015, January 24, 2016, for its third season, and 22 January 2017 for its fourth season. After a break from 2017-2021, the fifth season premiered on Januari 27, 2022. D'Academy was nominated for the Panasonic Gobel Awards 2015 & Panasonic Gobel Awards 2016 for Best Talent Search & Reality Show category. In addition, D 'Academy also managed to be nominated in the Indonesian Television Awards program award for the category of Most Popular Prime-Time Non Drama Program. There have been five winners of the show to date: Lesti Andryani, Evi Anggraini, Muhammad Irsyad Basir, Fildan Rahayu and Serli Artika Sridevi.

Format

Stages 
There are 6 stages in the competition, those being:

 Stage 1- Audition
 Stage 2- Final aduition concert 
 Stage 3- The Fifty-fifty Concert
 Stage 4- The wildcard Concert 
 Stage 5- The final concert 
 Stage 6- The Grand Final

The auditions take place in large cities all around in Indonesia, including Bandung, Surabaya, Semarang, Medan, Makassar, Palembang, and finally, Jakarta. Those auditioning first must be approved by a panel of local artists, then by Indosiar producers, and finally by the main judges. Participants  are given "golden tickets" to signify successful qualification to the subsequent round.

References

External links
 

Indonesian reality television series
Talent shows
2014 Indonesian television series debuts
Indosiar original programming